KQFE is a non-commercial radio station in Springfield, Oregon, broadcasting to the Eugene-Springfield, Oregon area on 88.9 FM.  KQFE airs several Christian ministry broadcasts from noted teachers such as RC Sproul, Alistair Begg, Ken Ham, John F. MacArthur, Adriel Sanchez, Dennis Rainey, John Piper, & others as well as traditional and modern hymns & songs by Keith & Kristyn Getty, The Master's Chorale, Fernando Ortega, Chris Rice, Shane & Shane, Sovereign Grace Music, Sara Groves, & multiple other Christian and Gospel music artists. KQFE is owned by the Family Radio Network.

External links

QFE
Springfield, Oregon
Family Radio stations